Filippo Berio is a brand of olive oils exported from Italy and made of oil from Italy, Greece, Spain and Tunisia.  The brand is used for virgin, extra-virgin and 'mild and light' oils, as well as wine vinegar, balsamic vinegar, pesto and olives.

History
A merchant named Filippo Berio first sold oil under his name in Italy in 1850. In 1919, his daughter Albertina, together with Giovanni Silvestrina and Dino Fontana, founded the Società per Azioni Lucchese Olii e Vini (SALOV).  SALOV now has a large production facility in Massarosa, outside Lucca. The company is now majority owned by China's Bright Food.

The Filippo Berio brand is exported worldwide to over 65 countries and is the market leader in the United States and the United Kingdom. In Italy, SALOV's brand is "Sagra".

Marketing
The brand obtained particular notoriety in 2007 due to its highly successful television advertising campaign with Gioacchino Rossini's famous Largo al Factotum (Figaro's Aria from The Barber of Seville) being sung with the substituted words "Filippo Berio, Filippo Berio, Filippo Berio, Filippo Berio, Filippo Berio, Filippo Berio, Filippo Berio Olive Oil".

Controversy
Class action lawsuits were filed against the company in 2015 alleging that the Berio oil was not entitled to the ‘extra virgin’ label and was misleadingly labelled "Imported from Italy”, with the actual origins hidden in fine print.

References

External links

Official Website

See also
 Olive oil regulation and adulteration
Extra Virginity

Olive oil
Brand name condiments
1850 introductions
Italian brands